Madison v. Alabama, 586 U.S. ___ (2019), was a United States Supreme Court case regarding the Eighth Amendment to the United States Constitution, barring cruel and unusual punishment. The case deals with whether the Eighth Amendment prohibits executing a person for a crime they do not remember.

Background
Vernon Madison (August 22, 1950 – February 22, 2020) shot police officer Julius Schulte twice in the back of the head in Mobile, Alabama in April 1985. Schulte was mediating a domestic disturbance between Madison and his ex-girlfriend; Madison also shot and injured her. Madison was an inmate at Holman Correctional Facility from September 1985 up until his death on February 22, 2020

Three trials were held, as the convictions from the first two were overturned: the first because prosecutors unconstitutionally excluded black people from the jury and the second because they introduced evidence improperly. In the third trial, the jury decided on a sentence of life in prison, but the judge Ferrill McRae overruled them and gave Madison a sentence of death in 1994.

The execution was scheduled to occur in May 2016; the 11th Circuit Court of Appeals granted a stay on the day of the execution, which the Supreme Court upheld 5-3 (at the time, one seat on the nine-member court was empty owing to Justice Antonin Scalia's death a few months prior).

In Dunn v. Madison, in November 2017, the Supreme Court unanimously overturned a 2-1 decision by the 11th Circuit, which had stopped the execution on the basis that Madison "does not rationally understand the connection between his crime and his execution". The Circuit Court was overruling a state court decision that had denied Madison's petition on the basis that Supreme Court precedent only barred execution if he lacked "understanding he is being executed as punishment for a crime". The Supreme Court did not rule on the merits of the case, but ruled that the Circuit Court overstepped its authority under the Antiterrorism and Effective Death Penalty Act of 1996, which set the standard for which federal courts can overturn a lower court's decision.

The execution was scheduled for January 2018; the Supreme Court granted a stay 30 minutes before Madison was scheduled to be executed, with Clarence Thomas, Samuel Alito, and Neil Gorsuch dissenting.

Madison's health
Madison had severe strokes in 2015 and 2016, resulting in vascular dementia and inability to remember killing police officer Schulte in 1985. Prior to his death, he was blind and had suffered a significant mental decline; he only remembered the alphabet up to the letter G and had slurred speech. The strokes caused physical damage as well, leaving him incontinent, unable to walk without a walker, and with slurred speech. However, according to the psychologist appointed by Alabama courts seeking his execution, he understood that he would be executed and the reason for that.

On Saturday, February 22, 2020, Vernon Madison died while he was still on death row at Alabama's Holman Correctional Facility in Atmore. He was 69 years old. He was never executed. Officials did not cite a cause of death, but they did say that foul play was unlikely. News reports said shortly after his death that results of an autopsy were pending.

Precedent
In Ford v. Wainwright, the Supreme Court held in 1986 that executing the insane is not allowed due to the Eighth Amendment, and in Panetti v. Quarterman, they held in 2007 that to be sentenced to death, an inmate must understand "the meaning and purpose of" his death sentence.

Case
The Supreme Court decided to hear the case in February 2018. Oral arguments were held on October 2, 2018. At oral argument, Alabama Deputy Attorney General Thomas Govan surprised some observers as well as Justices by agreeing with defense counsel Bryan Stevenson that dementia could be a form of incapacitation sufficient to meet the Ford and Panetti standards prohibiting the execution of some incapacitated inmates. Govan argued only that Madison's condition did not meet those tests because he still had the cognitive ability to understand why he was being executed, even if he could not recall the crime. Stevenson argued that Madison was disabled beyond solely memory loss and thus his execution would violate the Eighth Amendment's prohibition of cruel and unusual punishment.

Decision
In a 5-3 opinion, authored by Justice Kagan, the Court held that the Eighth Amendment may permit executing a prisoner even if he or she cannot remember committing his or her crime, but it may prohibit executing a prisoner who suffers from dementia or another disorder, rather than psychotic delusions. The Court held that if a prisoner is unable to rationally understand the reasons for his sentence, the Eighth Amendment forbids his execution.

Justice Alito in dissent, joined by Justice Thomas and Justice Gorsuch, would not have reached this question, stating that Madison presented only the first question (whether a state can execute a prisoner who cannot remember committing his crime) in his petition.

The Court remanded the case for the lower court to determine whether Madison was able to rationally understand the reasons for his sentence.

References

External links
 

2019 in United States case law
United States Supreme Court cases
United States Supreme Court cases of the Roberts Court
United States death penalty case law
Capital punishment in Alabama